Valter Biiber (31 August 1907 in Narva — 8 September 1977 in Tallinn) was an Estonian football player.

Career
He played for KS Võitleja Narva, VS Sport Tallinn, Narva THK and Türi Spordiring. During his career he has made two appearances for the Estonian national team.

In 1930, he was Estonian Football Championship top scorer with 5 goals.

References

Estonia international footballers
1907 births
1977 deaths
Sportspeople from Narva
People from Yamburgsky Uyezd
Estonian footballers
Association football midfielders